Alge Sachi is one of the woredas in the Oromia Region of Ethiopia. It used to be called Supena Sodo woreda. The major town is Alge.

Demographics 
The 2007 national census reported a total population for this woreda of 76,611, of whom 37,914 were men and 38,697 were women; 7,354 or 9.6% of its population were urban dwellers. The majority of the inhabitants were Protestant, with 46.13% of the population reporting they observed this belief, while 27.54% of the population said they were Moslem, and 25.62% practised Ethiopian Orthodox Christianity.

Notes 

Districts of Oromia Region